John Evans (23 February 1871 – 19 July 1924) was a Welsh international rugby union forward who later 'went North', switching to the professional rugby league code. Evans played for several teams, but is most notable for playing club rugby for Llanelli, and international rugby for Wales.

Rugby career
Evans first played club rugby for his hometown club of Ammanford, before switching to first class Welsh club Llanelli. It was while representing Llanelli that Evans was first selected to play for Wales, in the second game of the 1896 Home Nations Championship. Evans came into a pack along with four other new caps, a reaction by the Welsh selectors to the terrible defeat by England in the previous game. The new players were chosen for their rough physical style of play, and were dubbed 'Rhondda forwards' after the tough coal playing men from that area. The initial decision worked, with Wales winning 6-0 against Scotland at the Cardiff Arms Park. Evans was reselected for the third and final game of the Championship, an away game to Ireland. This time the new forward strategy was not successful with the Irish kick-and-rush tactics, and Wales lost 4-8. Despite the loss Evans was re-selected for the only game Wales played in the 1897 Home Nations Championship. The match saw Wales beat England by a record amount, but due to the Gould affair, Wales left the International Rugby Board, and could not play in any further international games.

In 1897, Evans moved to the Rhondda where he joined valley team Llwynypia, although not a 'Rhondda forward' when first capped for Wales, by the time his international career had ended he was a Rhondda collier. When the next Wales international was played, Evans' position was taken by Hopkin Davies, and Evans was not selected to play for Wales again. It is recorded that Evans eventually switched codes, to professional rugby league joining Swinton RLFC in October 1897, as a forward (prior to the specialist positions of), during the era of contested scrums. Both of his sons, Jack and Bryn played rugby league during the 1920s and 1930s.

International matches played
Wales
 1897
 1896
 1896

Bibliography

References 

1871 births
1924 deaths
Ammanford RFC players
Llanelli RFC players
Llwynypia RFC players
Rugby league forwards
Rugby league players from Carmarthenshire
Rugby union forwards
Rugby union players from Ammanford
Swinton Lions players
Wales international rugby union players
Welsh miners
Welsh rugby league players
Welsh rugby union players